The discography of American rapper Jack Harlow consists of two studio albums, six mixtapes, two extended plays, and 32 singles (including 6 as the featured artist). On March 13, 2020, his 22nd birthday, he released his second extended play, Sweet Action. The EP reached number 20 on the Billboard 200. It produced the top-10 single, "Whats Poppin", which reached number two on the Billboard Hot 100. On December 11, 2020, Harlow released his debut studio album, Thats What They All Say. The album debuted and peaked at number five on the Billboard 200. It produced the top-40 single, "Tyler Herro", which debuted and peaked at number 34 on the Hot 100. "Whats Poppin" is also included on the album, as well as the remix, which features DaBaby, Tory Lanez, and Lil Wayne. In 2021, Harlow released a collaboration with Lil Nas X, "Industry Baby", which became his first number-one single on the Hot 100. On May 6, 2022, Harlow released his second studio album, Come Home the Kids Miss You. The album debuted and peaked at number three on the Billboard 200. It produced his second number-one single, "First Class", which is also his first song to debut atop the Hot 100. It also produced the top-20 single, "Nail Tech", which debuted and peaked at number 18 on the Hot 100.

Studio albums

Mixtapes

Extended plays

Singles

As lead artist

As featured artist

Other charted and certified songs

Guest appearances

Cameo appearances

Notes

References 

Discographies of American artists
Hip hop discographies